Gone for Good may refer to:
"Gone for Good," a song by Morphine from their 1995 album Yes
"Gone for Good", a song by The Shins from their 2003 album Chutes Too Narrow
Gone for Good (novel), a novel by Harlan Coben
Gone for Good (TV series), Netflix original series based on the novel by Coben